The Paris Saint-Germain Academy, commonly known as the PSG Academy, is the youth system of both Paris Saint-Germain (men's team) and Paris Saint-Germain Féminine (women's team). Established in 1970, the academy is managed by the Association Paris Saint-Germain. Its first youth training centre opened in 1975 at the Camp des Loges in Saint-Germain-en-Laye, Île-de-France. The academy now has centres in several countries around the world. The club launched the women's section of the academy in 2012 at the Centre Sports et Loisirs de la Banque de France de Bougival (CSLBF de Bougival) in Bougival, Île-de-France.

Since its inception, PSG's youth system has produced several renowned players such as Jean-Marc Pilorget, Luis Fernandez, Nicolas Anelka, Mamadou Sakho, Kingsley Coman, Adrien Rabiot, Alphonse Areola, Presnel Kimpembe, Marie-Antoinette Katoto, Grace Geyoro, Perle Morroni and Sandy Baltimore. Many other graduates have also gone on to sign professional contracts with PSG or other clubs.

Recognized as one of the best in the country, the PSG Academy has been named Best Youth Club by the French Football Federation on four occasions. Domestically, the men's under-19 team have won a record four Championnat National U19 titles, one Coupe Gambardella and one Tournoi Carisport. The men's under-17 outfit have won three Championnat National U17 titles and one Championnat National des Cadets. The women's under-19 side have won the  three times.

In international club football, the men's U19 side have won one . The men's U17 squad have won a record three Alkass International Cups and one Montaigu Tournament. Additionally, the now-defunct men's reserve team won three Coupe de Paris. The club's amateur reserve side competes in the Championnat National 3.

History

First graduates and Coupe de Paris champions (1970–1987)

On 17 June 1970 Paris Football Club and Stade Saint-Germain merged to form men's football team Paris Saint-Germain Football Club. It was made official on 12 August 1970 with the creation of the Association Paris Saint-Germain. This organization has managed the club's amateur section, including the academy, ever since then. It also ran the professional section until 1991. So, like the club itself, the Paris Saint-Germain Academy was officially established on the same date.

The first wave of graduates emerged in the 1972–73 season. A total of ten players were promoted to the first team in what still is the largest class in the academy's history. It was made up of Éric Renaut, Patrice Zbinden, Claude Rivet, Patrice Turpin, Bernard Lambert, Michel Llodra, Robin Leclercq, Richard Vanquelles and Kamel Ben Mustapha. These players would all go on to play for the first team, with Renaut being the most successful one, amassing 290 appearances during his decade at the club. They were part of the club's reserve side that won the Coupe de Paris in 1971–72 and 1972–73, the academy's first titles ever. PSG won this cup again in 1979–80. 

On 4 November 1975, the club opened the academy's first centre, with Pierre Alonzo as its director. The maiden generation issued from this centre was led by François Brisson, Jean-Marc Pilorget, Lionel Justier and Thierry Morin. On 21 December 1975, a few weeks after the inauguration, PSG's so-called « four musketeers » made their professional debuts as starters against Reims in a league match at the Parc des Princes. Brisson won an Olympic gold medal with France in 1984, while Justier became a fan favorite at PSG. For his part, Pilorget remains to this day PSG's all-time record appearance maker with 435 official matches. Finally, Morin played most of his career with PSG before being named director of the CFA Omnisports in 1994. Formed at the club's initiative, this organization is responsible for the education of the academy players. Morin presided it until 2018. He is now the general secretary of the Association PSG.

Another great youth product was Luis Fernandez. A big PSG fan, he made his debut in 1978, became team captain and led the club to its first major trophies in the 1980s. He then returned as coach during PSG's golden era in the 1990s, leading them to the domestic cup double in 1995 and the UEFA Cup Winners' Cup in 1996.

Gambardella winners and rise to the top (1987–2009)

The late 1980s and early 1990s welcomed another bright generation of young players including Richard Dutruel, Jean-Claude Fernandes, Thomas Kokkinis, Roméo Calenda, Francis Llacer, Pascal Nouma and Bernard Allou. Before playing for the first team, they were part of the men's under-19 and reserve sides that claimed the Championnat National des Cadets title and the Coupe Gambardella in 1987–88 and 1990–91, respectively. The men's under-17 then won the Montaigu Tournament in 1993, while finishing runners-up in the Plougonvelin Tournament that same year. Already one of France's best youth systems, the PSG Academy were given the Best Youth Club award by the French Football Federation in 1988–89.

Dutruel, Llacer, Nouma and Allou were all part of the club's crowning glory in the 1996 UEFA Cup Winners' Cup Final with legend Luis Fernandez now as coach. Jérôme Leroy, Pierre Ducrocq and Nicolas Anelka also made their first-team breakthroughs during that decade. Anelka, however, was the pioneer of promising PSG talents signing for other European clubs due to the lack of game time. He signed for Arsenal in 1997 at the age of 17 for a really small fee. This would become a regular trend in the 2010s.

The later half of the 1990s and the early 2000s were bittersweet; players kept reaching the first team, but only Sylvain Distin, Bartholomew Ogbeche and Lorik Cana cemented their place in it. Additionally, the youth sides didn't win any trophy. Fortunes changed in the late 2000s as the PSG Academy slowly began its rise to the top of French youth football. Clément Chantôme and Mamadou Sakho were the two most successful graduates during these years. They were part of the men's under-19 side that won the club's first Championnat National U19 in 2006 and then became regular starters for the first team, playing over 200 games and winning several trophies. Sakho was also club captain between 2011 and 2012. Albeit with different players, the U19 team also won the Tournoi Carisport in 2008, a trophy which heralded an era of unprecedented success for the PSG Academy.

National dominance and talent exodus (2009–2019)

Since 2009–10, the academy teams have dominated the national scene. That season, the men's under-19 team won the Championnat National U19 final against Monaco, while the men's under-17 side lost to Sochaux on penalties. The club also began developing a women's section of the academy to strengthen its first-team squad with homegrown players, setting the goal of opening it by 2012 and having the first players graduating from it by 2014. The 2010–11 season was even more prolific as PSG became the first club to be crowned French champions in both age categories. The U19 won their second title in a row against Grenoble, while the U17 defeated arch-rivals Marseille in the final to clinch the club's first Championnat National U17 title. PSG received the Best Youth Club award for the second time in history in recognition of their U17/U19 double. They won it again in 2012–13 and 2013–14.

The U19 participated in another final in 2011–12 but they would have to wait until 2015–16 and their victory over Lyon to be champions again. That same season, following two consecutive silver medals in 2013–14 and 2014–15, the U17 defeated Saint-Étienne and won the title as well, thus handing PSG their second double. They claimed their second championship in a row and third overall after beating Monaco in 2016–17. The women's department has been doing just as well. As planned, the club inaugurated it at the Bougival training center in 2012 and Grace Geyoro became the first graduate to play for the professional team in 2014. The U19 have reached the  final a record six times since 2013–14, winning three of them. The ladies defeated Lyon in 2015–16, 2016–17 and 2018–19 to clinch the trophy.

The academy has also shined at the European and international level. Simultaneously, the U17 have dominated the Alkass International Cup, contested in Doha, Qatar by teams from around the world. They won the inaugural edition in 2012 and reached the final in 2013, before regaining the trophy in 2015 and 2018.

Despite its success, the academy has seen the exodus of several promising talents to other European clubs for free since 2014. This has been the case of Kingsley Coman (Juventus, 2014), Dan-Axel Zagadou (Borussia Dortmund, 2017), Claudio Gomes (Manchester City, 2018), Tanguy Kouassi (Bayern Munich, 2020), Adil Aouchiche (Saint-Étienne, 2020),  (Lyon, 2020) and Alice Sombath (Lyon, 2020). Conversely, other graduates like Adrien Rabiot, Alphonse Areola, Presnel Kimpembe, Marie-Antoinette Katoto, Grace Geyoro, Perle Morroni and Sandy Baltimore have played big roles in the men's and women's first teams.

Dissolution of reserve team and COVID-19 pandemic (2019–present)

In May 2019, following the end of the 2018–19 season, the club decided to dissolve its men's reserve team and instead focus on the under-19s squad from the 2019–20 campaign onwards. The reserves used to compete in the Championnat National 2, the fourth tier of French football. Consequently, the under-19s side became the last step before breaking into the first team. Club officials considered that the reserves no longer offered the desirable conditions in preparing players for the step up to the professional squad. In fact, many of PSG's starlets had skipped the reserves and gone straight into the first team.

The 2019–20 season would have been the academy's first without its reserve team. In mid-April 2020, however, the French Football Federation (FFF) voided all amateur football leagues because of the COVID-19 pandemic and its impact on football. As the coronavirus outbreak continued to spread, the FFF suspended the 2020–21 campaign for amateur teams in October 2020 before definitely voiding it in March 2021. Despite the forced inactivity, the FFF still recognized the PSG Academy as the country's best youth system in 2019 and 2020.

In the 2021–22 season, the first to be fully completed since the pandemic began, the male U19 and U17 sides were both eliminated at the semifinal stage of their respective championships, while the female U19 failed to defend their league crown and finished second to Lyon.

Organization

Teams

Players recruited by the club join the Paris Saint-Germain Academy from a young age and work their way up to the youth system's top teams before breaking into the men's and women's professional squads. Male players have to pass through the U17 and U19 sides before being promoted to the first team, while the U19 side is the final step for female players. The men's U19 compete in four competitions – the Championnat National U19, the Coupe Gambardella, the UEFA Youth League and the Premier League International Cup. Likewise, the men's U17 play in the Championnat National U17 and the Al Kass International Cup.

Formerly, there was also a men's reserve side, which competed in the Championnat National 2. It was dissolved after the end of the 2018–19 season. In 2019, the club's second reserve side was promoted to the Championnat National 3. However, the team is not linked to the professional team nor the youth academy; it is solely made up of amateur players. Despite this, several youth players have played matches for the team.

Schools

The Paris Saint-Germain Academy began expanding its network in 2005 as part of the club's international development strategy. Pauleta, emblematic club legend and striker from 2003 to 2008, is the academy's official ambassador. Year-round, the PSG Academy centers scattered across the globe welcome all children, boys and girls, age 4 through 17 in 19 countries: the United States, Canada, Brazil, France, Wales, England, Germany, Portugal, Turkey, Qatar, Kuwait, Russia, Egypt, Senegal, Rwanda, South Korea, Thailand, China and the United Arab Emirates. The academy also offers these children an adapted and complete scholarly education assured by the Centre de Formation d'Apprentis Omnisports Ile-de-France (CFA Omnisports).

Grounds

The men's youth teams train at the Camp des Loges in Saint-Germain-en-Laye, while the women's under-19 players do so at the Centre Sports et Loisirs de la Banque de France de Bougival (CSLBF de Bougival) in Bougival. The Camp des Loges has been the men's training facility since the first centre of the PSG Academy opened there in 1975. All three sides play their home matches at the Stade Municipal Georges Lefèvre, a sports complex located just across the street from the Camp des Loges. Its main stadium has a seating capacity of 2,164 spectators. This arena — as well as the other artificial turf and grass football pitches of the complex — host home matches for the club's male and female academy sides.

The Paris Saint-Germain Training Center, sometimes referred to as Campus PSG, located in Poissy, Paris Region, will be the new training ground and sports complex of PSG. Owned and financed by the club, the venue will bring together PSG's male football, handball and judo teams, as well as the football and handball academies. The Camp des Loges will in turn become the training ground of the female football team and academy. The Campus PSG will have its own stadium. With a total capacity of 5,000, the arena will host UEFA Youth League, Division 1 Féminine and UEFA Women's Champions League matches. French youth league matches will continue to be played at the Stade Georges Lefèvre.

Honours

As of the end of the 2021–22 season.

 
  shared record

Players

As of 29 January 2023.

Men's under-19

Men's under-17

Women's under-19

Notable graduates

Men

Since the academy's inception, 147 graduates have played for the men's first team.

Women

Since the launch of the women's section of the academy, 20 graduates have played for the first team.

Titi d'Or

The Titi d'Or is an annual award presented by Les Titis du PSG to the most promising and best talents in the Paris Saint-Germain Academy. Les Titis du PSG is an association affiliated to Paris Saint Germain that covers news of the club's academy. The prize has been awarded to male players since 2007, with an exception in 2010 due to technical reasons. Since 2019, it has also been presented to the most gifted female player.

Personnel

As of 16 January 2023.

Management

Technical staff

References

External links

Official websites
PSG.FR - Site officiel du Paris Saint-Germain
Paris Saint-Germain - Ligue 1
Paris Saint-Germain - UEFA.com

French reserve football teams
Paris Saint-Germain F.C.
Football academies in France
UEFA Youth League teams
NextGen series
Premier League International Cup